Carina García (born 3 January 1984) is a Bolivian sports shooter. She competed in the women's 10 metre air rifle event at the 2016 Summer Olympics.

References

External links
 

1984 births
Living people
Bolivian female sport shooters
Olympic shooters of Bolivia
Shooters at the 2016 Summer Olympics
Pan American Games competitors for Bolivia
Shooters at the 2011 Pan American Games
Place of birth missing (living people)